Kristie Boogert and Nathalie Tauziat won in the final 2–6, 6–4, 6–2 against Barbara Rittner and Dominique Van Roost.

Seeds
Champion seeds are indicated in bold text while text in italics indicates the round in which those seeds were eliminated.

 Kristie Boogert /  Nathalie Tauziat (champions)
 Sabine Appelmans /  Miriam Oremans (semifinals)
 Amanda Coetzer /  Ruxandra Dragomir (first round)
 Laura Golarsa /  Christina Singer (semifinals)

Draw

External links
 1996 SEAT Open Doubles Draw

1996 WTA Tour
Luxembourg Open
1996 in Luxembourgian tennis